The Summer 2011 Jabal al-Zawiya operation occurred during an early phase of the Syrian civil war.

On Wednesday, 29 June Syrian army launched an extensive operation in the villages of Jebel al-Zawiya in the west of the 
Idlib province, claiming the lives of at least 11 people.

A resident of Jabal al-Zawya said he heard large explosions overnight around the villages of Rama and Orum al-Joz, west of the highway linking the cities of Hama and Aleppo. Another resident said 30 tanks rolled into Jabal al-Zawya on Monday from the village of Bdama on the Turkish border, where troops broke into houses and burnt crops.

On 30 June, it was reported that Syrian army forces spread through a restive mountainous area near the Turkish border, as the death toll from a two-day military siege rose to 19 people, according to activists and a witness.

Scope of assault

The action by Syrian troops in the northwestern area of Jabal al-Zawiya appeared to be aimed at preventing residents from fleeing to Turkey.

See also

References

Military operations of the Syrian civil war in 2011
Military operations of the Syrian civil war involving the Syrian government